Donna Lobban, also known as Donna Belle Urquhart, (born 19 December 1986) is a retired professional squash player who represents Australia. She reached a career high world ranking of 13 in May, 2011.

Early life 
Lobban was born Donna Belle Urquhart.

Career 
Donna started playing squash from the age of 6. As a junior, she won five Australian Junior titles and was the runner-up at the Scottish and British Junior Opens in 2002 & 2003. She played for her country at the 2003 World Junior Women's Championships in Egypt where, at age 16, she made the last 16 of the individual draw, and was the runner-up in the teams event.

In 2010, she was part of the Australian team that won the gold medal at the 2010 Women's World Team Squash Championships. She reached a career-high world ranking of World No. 13 in May 2011.

She was the champion of the Monte-Carlo Squash Classic in 2017, defeating Zeina Mickawy in the final.

Personal life 
In April 2018, she married Scottish professional squash player Greg Lobban and is now known professionally as Donna Lobban.

References

External links
 
 
 

1986 births
Living people
Australian female squash players
Commonwealth Games gold medallists for Australia
Commonwealth Games bronze medallists for Australia
Commonwealth Games medallists in squash
Squash players at the 2010 Commonwealth Games
Squash players at the 2018 Commonwealth Games
People from New South Wales
Competitors at the 2013 World Games
21st-century Australian women
Medallists at the 2010 Commonwealth Games
Medallists at the 2018 Commonwealth Games